Gordon Jones may refer to:

Sportspeople
Gordon Jones (footballer born 1886) (1886–1977), Builth F.C. and Wales international footballer
Gordon Jones (footballer, born 1889), English football player for Bolton Wanderers, Tottenham Hotspur and several other clubs
Gordon Jones (footballer, born 1943), English football player for Middlesbrough
Gordon Jones (Australian footballer) (1913–1999), Australian rules footballer
Gordon Jones (baseball) (1930–1994), Major League Baseball pitcher
Gordon Jones (American football) (born 1957), American football player

Others
Gordon Jones (actor) (1911–1963), noted for playing the Green Hornet in a movie serial
Gordon Jones (folk musician) (born 1947), Scottish musician
Doug Jones (politician) (Gordon Douglas Jones, born 1954), U.S. Senator from Alabama